Issikiopteryx zonophaera is a moth in the family Lecithoceridae. It is found in Taiwan and eastern Zhejiang, China.

References

Moths described in 1935
Moths of Asia
Moths of Taiwan
Issikiopteryx